Sheffield Old Town Hall is a building in Waingate in central Sheffield, South Yorkshire, England, opposite Castle Market. It is a Grade II listed building.

History
In William Harrison's Survey of the Manor of Sheffield, dated 29 September 1637, there is a mention of an early "Sheffield Towne Hall". The early "Sheffield Towne Hall" was replaced by a second building, which had been designed by William Renny in 1699 and opened in 1700. The second town hall was next to the parish church, on a site with little space for extension.

The third town hall, now referred to as the "Old Town Hall", was designed by Charles Watson in the Neoclassical style and built between 1807 and 1808. It was designed to house not only the Town Trustees but also the Petty and Quarter Sessions. Initially building was of five bays and faced Castle Street. It was extended in 1833 and again in 1866 to designs by William Flockton (1804–64) of Sheffield and his partner George Abbott. The most prominent feature was the new central clock tower over a new main entrance that reoriented the building to Waingate, the materials of which came from the parts of the building which had been demolished. At the same time the building's courtrooms were linked by underground passages to the neighbouring Sheffield Police Offices.
The first Town Council was elected in 1843 and took over the lease of the Town Trustees' hall in 1866. The next year the building was extensively renovated and the clock tower designed by Flockton & Abbott was added.

By the 1890s Sheffield's administration had again outgrown the building, and the current Sheffield Town Hall was built further south. The Old Town Hall was again extended between 1896 and 1897, by the renamed Flockton, Gibbs & Flockton, and became the local meeting place for the Crown Court and the High Court. The drinking fountain on the Castle Street side of the building was added at this time. In 1973 the Old Town Hall was made a Grade II listed building.

In 1995 these courts moved to the new Law Courts, and, since then, the building has remained disused. In 2008 the Victorian Society named the building as one of its top ten buildings most at-risk. A campaign group, The Friends of the Old Town Hall was formed in November 2014 with the aim of getting the building's owner G1 London Property to state its intention for its future use. In September 2015 the building was put for sale with an asking price of £2,000,000. The sale brochure was withdrawn from the internet after about ten days. In December 2019 plans were approved to develop the building into Pod hotel rooms and apartments. Sheffield City Council said the 42,000 sq ft building can be developed while "preserving it as much as possible". The new plans are for serviced apartments, shops, cafes and hotel rooms.

Notes

References

Bibliography

External links

City and town halls in South Yorkshire
Clock towers in the United Kingdom
Former courthouses in England
Government buildings completed in 1808
Grade II listed buildings in Sheffield
Neoclassical architecture in England
Towers in South Yorkshire